Warren Ham (born 1957) is an American multi-instrumentalist. He is best known for playing with Kansas (1982), Toto (1986-1988, and since 2017) and Ringo Starr (since 2015).

During the early '70s, Warren and his brother Bill formed The Ham Brothers Band and included Ira Wilkes on bass, Red Young on piano and organ and Dahrell Norris on drums. The group recorded for Texas producer Huey P. Meaux. Despite critical acclaim for the work, the album never made it in the marketplace. It was soon taken out of print.

In 1978 The Ham Brothers band had replaced Wilkes and Young with Bob Parr and Ken Rarrick, both from the acclaimed jazz education program at the University of North Texas. Later that same year, David Gates, of Bread fame, hired the Ham Brothers to tour as part of Bread. The act was then billed as David Gates and Bread. A year later pop diva Cher secured the services of the same band. When Cher recorded the project album Black Rose, Warren joined the band for the recording and the subsequent supporting tour.

In his early years, Ham was a vocalist and played the reeds for the Fort Worth, Texas based Bloodrock (1972–74). Ham appeared on the last two Bloodrock albums: Passage and Whirlwind Tongues.

Warren Ham has also toured with Kansas in the John Elefante era (in 1982, played additional keyboards, flute, alto and soprano saxophones, harmonica and backing vocals), Toto (1986-1988, and since 2017), and Donna Summer (1983). He toured with Olivia Newton-John in 2006 as an instrumentalist and vocalist performing John Travolta's part with Newton-John on her No. 1 Grease hit, "You're The One That I Want", as well as backing vocals.

When Kerry Livgren left Kansas to form his own Christian rock band AD, Ham went with him as the new band's lead singer.   Ham appeared on the first, second and fourth of AD's four albums:  1) Timeline 2) Art of the State and 3) Prime Mover.

Ham was a featured vocalist and instrumentalist for the Maranatha! Promise Band - the worship band for the Promise Keepers men's movement put together by Maranatha! Music from Promise Keepers' incarnation in 1993 to 1996.  He appeared on their 1993 album, Face to Face with the song "This Is What I Believe", and on their 1996 album, Break Down the Walls, on the song "Send Me" along with Steven Jackson and Leonard Tucker. He was also a part of the live touring version of the Promise Band for the 1995 Promise Keepers conference season where he played harmonica, saxophone, trumpet, flute, and other wind instruments along with backup vocals.  This was documented in the VHS video and CD "Live Worship With The Maranatha! Promise Band" where he most famously played an intro to "Man Of The Spirit, Man Of The Word".

Since the demise of AD, he has released solo recordings in the contemporary Christian music genre "Come on Children" and is the author of  Beginning Blues/Rock Harmonica. From 1996 to 2000, Ham toured as part of Frankie Valli and The Four Seasons.

Warren Ham also appeared as an integral member of Donna Summer's live band on her 2008 tour (having first appeared as part of her 1983 touring group) supporting her 2008 release Crayons. Warren Ham toured with Ringo Starr and His All-Starr Band in 2015, 2016, 2018, 2019, 2020, and 2022. In 2017, he toured with Toto.

References 

Singers from Texas
American male singers
Living people
People from Fort Worth, Texas
1957 births
Ringo Starr & His All-Starr Band members
The Four Seasons (band) members
American Christians
Bloodrock members
AD (band) members